Sovkhozny (masculine), Sovkhoznaya (feminine), or Sovkhoznoye (neuter) may refer to:
Sovkhozny, Republic of Adygea, a settlement in the Republic of Adygea, Russia
Sovkhozny, name of several other rural localities in Russia
Sovkhoznoye, name of several other rural localities in Russia

See also
Sovkhoz